Yeh Yung-chieh (born April 21, 1985 in Taiwan) is a Taiwanese baseball player who currently plays for Brother Elephants of Chinese Professional Baseball League. He currently plays as relief pitcher for the Elephants.

Career statistics

See also
 Chinese Professional Baseball League

References

External links
 

1985 births
Living people
Brother Elephants players
Baseball players from New Taipei